Fan-out has multiple meanings in software engineering.

Message-oriented middleware 
In message-oriented middleware solutions, fan-out is a messaging pattern used to model an information exchange that implies the delivery (or spreading) of a message to one or multiple destinations possibly in parallel, and not halting the process that executes the messaging to wait for any response to that message.

Software design and quality assurance 
In software construction, the fan-out of a class or method is the number of other classes used by that class or the number of other methods called by that method.

Additionally, fan-out has impact on the quality of a software.

See also 

 Middleware
 Coupling (computer programming)
 Software quality
 Software metric

References

Middleware